Almaz Central Marine Design Bureau is a company based in Saint Petersburg, Russia. It is part of the United Shipbuilding Corporation.

Almaz is a leading designer of high-speed combat ships and boats, including dynamically supported craft (hydrofoils, hovercraft, and surface-effect ships). Almaz is the designer of the Dergach missile air cushion vehicle, the Nanuchka and Tarantul-class missile corvettes, the Matka-class missile hydrofoil, the Pauk-class anti-submarine warfare vessel, and the Pomornik-class air cushion vehicle.

References

External links
 Official website

Manufacturing companies of Russia
Companies based in Saint Petersburg
Russian brands
United Shipbuilding Corporation
Ministry of the Shipbuilding Industry (Soviet Union)
Design bureaus
Defence companies of the Soviet Union